Rabbi Re'em HaCohen (Hebrew: רא''ם הכהן; born 1 March 1957; 25 Adar I 5717) is an Israeli Religious Zionist rabbi. HaCohen is the Rosh yeshiva of Yeshivat Otniel (together with Rabbi Binyamin Kalmanzon) and the rabbi of the Israeli settlement of Otniel.

Biography 
Re'em HaCohen was born in Jerusalem on 1 March 1957 to Yedaya, a principal at Yeshivat Har Etzion and son of Zionist thinker Shmuel HaCohen Weingarten, and Dina, head of Midreshet Emuna and daughter of Zionist pioneer Natan Gardi. He was named after his great-grandfather, Rabbi Avraham Mordechai. He grew up on the border of Jerusalem's Rehavia and Sha'arei Hesed neighbourhoods. In his youth, Hacohen would frequently visit the house of Rabbi Shlomo Zalman Auerbach.

He studied at Netiv Meir Yeshiva High School under Rabbis Arye Bina and David Fuchs, and after that at Yeshivat Har Etzion in Alon Shvut under Rabbis Aharon Lichtenstein and Yehuda Amital. He served in the Israeli Armoured Corps and advanced to the rank of Major in the Reserves. HaCohen received semikhah from Rabbi Lichtenstein and Rabbi Eliezer Waldenberg (author of the halachic treatise Tzitz Eliezer). He also studied with Rabbi Sholom Eisen, a posek in the Edah HaChareidis.

HaCohen served as a Ra"m at Yeshivat Or Etzion under Rabbi Haim Drukman and at Yeshivat Shvut Yisrael in Efrat. In 1994, he was invited by rabbis Binyamin Kalmanzon and Ami Ulami to be a Rosh Yeshiva at Yeshivat Otniel. After Ulami was murdered that year, HaCohen became the community rabbi of the town of Otniel.

In the past, Rabbi HaCohen worked with the organisation "Circles of Justice". In 2006, he was nominated for the post of Chief Rabbi of the IDF.

He serves on the judging panel of "Kane Lecha Chaver", a Torah competition run by Mifal HaPayis.

Family 
Rabbi HaCohen and his wife Noa have 9 children. His son, Rabbi Uri HaCohen, is a Ra"m at Yeshivat Otniel. Another son, Lt. Col. Yoni HaCohen, is the commander of the IDF Paratrooper's 890th "Efah" Battalion .

His oldest brother is Major-General Gershon HaCohen, a senior IDF officer. His other brothers are Rabbi Elyashiv HaCohen, Rosh yeshiva at Yeshivat Beit Shmuel in Hadera, Rabbi Aviya HaCohen, Ra"m at Yeshivat Tekoa, and Rabbi Chayim HaCohen, head of the Beit Yatir pre-army program. His brother-in-law is Rabbi Aharon Harel, head of Lev Chadash Yeshiva High School in Shilo.

Opinions and philosophy 

According to Rabbi HaCohen, the learning in the beit midrash must be connected to the outside world, as the inner parts of the Torah must be connected to the outer parts. For this reason, his teaching references many different sources ranging from academic and professional, to halachic and kabbalistic sources. Rabbi HaCohen's educational philosophy is characterised by contemplative independence. As a student of Rabbi Lichtenstein, he uses the Brisker method of learning Talmud. He is a student of  Kabbalah, especially the teachings of the Ramchal, Chabad (in particular the Baal HaTanya) and Menahem Azariah da Fano. The teachings of Rav Kook are also central to his philosophy, particularly as they are interpreted by Rabbi David Cohen. HaCohen thinks that it is halachically binding to donate one's organs and have an organ donor card. He forbids smoking as a form of suicide. He requires his followers to wear techelet.

Works 
 Badai Ha-Aron- Talmudic insights
 He'elem veGilui - on the revelation of God, from Creation to the Second Tablets
 Kol Damamah and LaRahok ve Karov- on the High Holy Days
 Benai Neviim - the meaning of prophecy for our era
 Reeh ve-Yirah - Abraham and Isaac for our time
 Derekh Sha'ar Elyon - on the sacrificial tractate and the Temple Service

References

External links

1957 births
Religious Zionist rosh yeshivas
Israeli Orthodox rabbis
20th-century Israeli rabbis
21st-century Israeli rabbis
Living people
Israeli settlers
People from Jerusalem
Yeshivat Har Etzion